Laura Thompson is a former Independent member of the Texas House of Representatives. She represented District 120 after winning a special election on August 2, 2016, after former state representative Ruth McClendon retired. In the November 2016 general election, she ran for election to a full term but was defeated by Barbara Gervin-Hawkins. Thompson's brief tenure in the Texas House ended on January 9, 2017. Thompson was the first Independent to serve in the Texas Legislature in over fifty years.

In October 2016, Democratic Party officials in Bexar County unsuccessfully sued to remove Thompson's name from the ballot in the November 2016 election, claiming that her nomination papers lacked enough valid signatures.

References

Living people
Members of the Texas House of Representatives
Howard University alumni
21st-century American politicians
Texas Independents
Women state legislators in Texas
21st-century American women politicians
Year of birth missing (living people)